Vanda denisoniana is a species of orchid found from China (Yunnan) to northern Indochina. It was named after Lady Ida Emily Augusta Denison, an orchid enthusiast.

References

External links 

denisoniana